Mount Parang or Gunung Parang (gunung-mountain, parang-machete), is a mountain in the Purwakarta Regency of West Java in Indonesia.

Located between the two main arms of the Jatiluhur Reservoir, this andesite mountain of volcanic rock shows three distinct peaks stretching some 1.5 km from north to south, the highest of which is 963m above sea-level. Its 600m cliffs, offering hard rock and scant holds, make it a popular venue for recreational rock climbers.

Mount Parang  is "The Park" or "The Mecca" of rock climbing in Indonesia.
This mountain has become well known in the world of Indonesia's rock climbing since 1980, and it is where climbing as a sport started in Indonesia. Any rock climber's list of ascents is regarded as incomplete if he has not tried climbing and creating a new route on Mount Parang, where climbing is different from that of other big walls around the world, 
since one is subjected to extremely hot and humid weather, rain, difficult rock, and a beautiful panoramic view. Mount Parang has three main peaks, better known as Tower 1, Tower 2 and Tower 3, and several other smaller peaks. Various climbing routes are available, but the more popular climbing route is "240" on Tower 2, made by Skygers, a rock climbing group from Bandung. The route "Special Forces" on Tower 3, was put up by the Indonesian Army's Special Forces. There are many other climbs in the area put up by teams from Indonesia and internationally.

The best climbing season is in the months from June to October, because it rarely rains, and does not interfere with climbing. However one cannot rule out the possibility of a weather change at any time, and patience is useful here. To climb Mount Parang, physical and mental preparation should be made, as well as the use of proper equipment and skills. 
Safety considerations should be foremost, since on Mount Parang emergencies can easily arise. Mount Parang is managed and monitored by local villagers under community of Badega Gunung Parang with full support from the authorities of Purwakarta.

References

External links
Gunung Bagging
Badega Gunung Parang

Mountains of West Java
Purwakarta Regency